Babylonia umbilifusca is a species of sea snail, a marine gastropod mollusc in the family Babyloniidae.

Description

Distribution

References

Babyloniidae
Gastropods described in 2003